{{DISPLAYTITLE:C5H10S}}
The molecular formula C5H10S (molar mass: 102.20 g/mol, exact mass: 102.0503 u) may refer to:

 Thiane
 Prenylthiol, also known as 3-methyl-2-butene-1-thiol